Dhamor Union is a union parishad of Atwari Upazila, in Panchagarh District, Rangpur Division of Bangladesh. There are 13 villages and 13 mouzas in the union.

References

External links
 

Unions of Atwari Upazila
Unions of Panchagarh District
Unions of Rangpur Division